Onehunga, initially with the formal name of Town of Onehunga, is a former New Zealand parliamentary electorate in the south of the city of Auckland. Between 1861 and 1881, and between 1938 and 1996, it was represented by seven Members of Parliament. It was a stronghold for the Labour Party.

Population centres
In the 1860 electoral redistribution, the House of Representatives increased the number of representatives by 12, reflecting the immense population growth since the original electorates were established in 1853. The redistribution created 15 additional electorates with between one and three members, and Onehunga was one of the single-member electorates. The electorates were distributed to provinces so that every province had at least two members. Within each province, the number of registered electors by electorate varied greatly.

The 1931 New Zealand census had been cancelled due to the Great Depression, so the 1937 electoral redistribution had to take ten years of population growth into account. The increasing population imbalance between the North and South Islands had slowed, and only one electorate seat was transferred from south to north. Five electorates were abolished, one former electorate (Onehunga) was re-established, and four electorates were created for the first time.

The electorate was urban, and comprised a number of suburbs in the southern part of Auckland.

History
The electorate existed in the 19th century from 1861 to 1871 as Town of Onehunga, and then from 1871 to 1881 as Onehunga. For the whole period the seat was held by George O'Rorke, who became Speaker of the House of Representatives in 1879.

Onehunga was recreated in 1938, and lasted to 1996. With the introduction of MMP in 1996, Onehunga and Panmure were combined into the new electorate of Maungakiekie.

Except for 1990–1993, Onehunga was held by Labour from its 1938 recreation.

Members of Parliament
The Onehunga electorate was represented by seven Members of Parliament.

Key

Election results

1993 election

1990 election

1987 election

1984 election

1981 election

1980 by-election

1978 election

1975 election

1972 election

1969 election

1966 election

1963 election

1960 election

1957 election

1954 election

1953 by-election

1951 election

1949 election

1946 election

1943 election

1938 election

Notes

References

Historical electorates of New Zealand
Politics of the Auckland Region
1860 establishments in New Zealand
1881 disestablishments in New Zealand
1996 disestablishments in New Zealand
1938 establishments in New Zealand